April Moon is the second studio album by English singer-songwriter Sam Brown, released on 2 April 1990 by A&M Records. The album was produced by Sam Brown, and her brother Pete Brown.

The album peaked at number 38 on the UK Albums Chart and number 30 on the Australian ARIA Charts. The album spawned three charting singles in the United Kingdom: "With a Little Love" peaked at number 44 on the UK Singles Chart; "Kissing Gate" at number 23; "Mindworks" at number 77. The album has sold over half a million copies worldwide. April Moon was certified silver by the British Phonographic Industry (BPI) on 17 October 1990.

Then-Pink Floyd member David Gilmour sang backing vocals on the track "Troubled Soul" (he had also appeared on Brown's debut album, Stop!, in 1988).

Track listing

Personnel
Adapted from the album's liner notes.

Musicians

 Sam Brown – lead vocals (all tracks), piano (tracks 1, 3–5, 8–12, 15–16), Minimoog bass (tracks 3, 5), organ (tracks 3, 15), Hammond (tracks 4, 6, 12, 16), keyboards (track 2, 14), SH-101 (track 9), D-50 (track 10), tambourine (track 14), percussion (track 15)
 Pete Brown – guitars (tracks 1–4, 8, 10–15), bass (track 16), backing vocals (track 3, 5–6, 10, 14–16), SH-101 (track 3, 12), keyboards (track 6), percussion (track 6)
 Joe Brown – mandolin (track 2)
 Vicki Brown – backing vocals (tracks 2, 7, 13, 15)
 Jim Archer – violin (track 4)
 Paul Bangash – guitar (tracks 1–8, 10–16), backing vocals (tracks 2, 5–6, 10, 14)
 Guy Barker – piccolo trumpet (track 2)
 Mark Berrow – violin (track 4)
 Margo Buchanan – backing vocals (tracks 1, 5–6, 10, 13–15)
 Ben Cruft – violin (track 4)
 Danny Cummings – percussion (tracks 8, 10, 13)
 Martin Ditchman – percussion (tracks 2, 7)
 Mitt Gamon – harmonica (track 16)
 Will Gibson – violin (tracks 1, 5)
 David Gilmour – vocals (track 11)
 Tim Good – violin (track 4)
 Nick Ingman – MD strings (tracks 1, 4–5)
 Carol Isaacs – piano (track 15)
 Cameron Jenkins – saxophones (track 13)
 Sara Jones – backing vocals (tracks 7, 13)
 Simeon Jones – mouth organ (track 6), saxophone solo (track 13), baritone saxophone (track 13)
 Paul Kegg – cello (track 4)
 Ben Kennard – cello (track 4)
 David Levy – bass (track 4, 15)
 Helen Lichmann – cello (1, 5)
 Jon Lord – piano (track 6)
 Martin Loveday – cello (1, 5)
 Ian Maidman – bass (tracks 6, 10, 12, 14), vocals (track 10), Chapman Stick (track 8), piano (track 14), acoustic guitar (track 14)
 Chucho Merchán – double bass (track 11)
 Richard Newman – drums (tracks 1–4, 6–8, 10–16), percussion (track 5)
 Naomi Osborne – backing vocals (tracks 10, 15)
 Pete Oxer – violin (track 4)
 George Robertson – violin (1, 5)
 Phil Saatchi – backing vocals (track 1)
 Danny Schogger – piano (track 2), clarinet (track 6), keyboards (track 8)
 Matthew Seligman – bass (tracks 1–2, 7–8, 13), additional double bass (track 11)
 Paul Silverthorne – viola (track 4)
 Linda Taylor – backing vocals
 Tina Warrilow – backing vocals (tracks 7, 13)
 Chris Wellington – viola (track 4)
 John Williams – violin (track 4)
 Gavyn Wright – first violin (tracks 1, 5), violin (track 4)

Technical
 Produced by Pete Brown and Sam Brown
 Additional engineering by Pete Brown
 Recording and mixing engineer: Robin Evans
 Assistant engineer: Jock Loveband
 Management: Lisa Denton
 Photography: Mike Owen, Robert Ogilvie; assisted by Clare Hanford
 Design and art direction: Jeremy Pearce; assisted by Simon Carrington and Les Watts

Charts

Certifications

References

External links
 

1990 albums
A&M Records albums
Sam Brown (singer) albums